Cloonsheerevagh (: "speckled fairy meadow") is a townland in Carrick-on-Shannon in County Leitrim.

As this townland is almost parallel with its southern neighbour Cloonsheebane, the landscape and name are both similar.  It is likely that this meadow may have been speckled with bushes or field enclosures, thus giving the name riabach. The other neighbouring townlands are Hartley, Caldragh, and Cartown.

Townlands of County Leitrim
Carrick-on-Shannon